Barry Charles Diller (born February 2, 1942) is an American businessman. He is Chairman and Senior Executive of IAC and Expedia Group and founded the Fox Broadcasting Company and USA Broadcasting. Diller was inducted into the Television Hall of Fame in 1994.

Early life
Diller was born into a Jewish household in San Francisco, California, and is the son of Reva (née Addison) and Michael Diller.

Career
Diller began his career through a family connection in the mailroom of the William Morris Agency after dropping out of UCLA after three weeks. His proximity to the company's file room meant that he could spend free time reading through the archives and learning the entire history of the entertainment industry. He was hired as an assistant by Elton Rule, then West Coast head of ABC, who was promoted to network President at the same time Diller went to work for him in 1964, taking him on to New York City. Diller was soon placed in charge of negotiating broadcast rights to feature films. He was promoted to Vice President of Development in 1965. In this position, Diller created the ABC Movie of the Week, pioneering the concept of the made-for-television movie through a regular series of 90-minute films produced exclusively for television.

Paramount
Diller served for 10 years as the Chairman and Chief Executive Officer of Paramount Pictures Corporation from 1974 until 1984. With Diller at the helm, the studio produced hit television programs such as Laverne & Shirley (1976), Taxi (1978), and Cheers (1982) and films that include Saturday Night Fever (1977), Grease (1978), Raiders of the Lost Ark (1981) and sequel Indiana Jones and the Temple of Doom (1984), Terms of Endearment (1983), and Beverly Hills Cop (1984). The New York Times reported in 1983 that Diller was also "one of the three key executives" for then Paramount parent company Gulf+Western, with A. D. Murphy, director of the motion picture producing program at the University of Southern California, even describing him as "probably the most successful executive in the film business today." In the same article, Diller stated, among other things, that he wanted to use Paramount to make movies based on games distributed by then Gulf+Western-owned video game manufacturing company Sega. As head of Paramount, Diller also put together a three-way ownership of the USA Network in 1981 in order to prevent the Gulf+Western owned Madison Square Garden from selling its interest in the network. Diller also focused on having the Madison Square Garden maintain rights to its sports games, which in turn could allow for an extended level of broadcasting for future Madison Square Garden events as not only a source of programming for the USA Network, but also as a source of programming for Madison Square Garden Network cable subscribers and any future regional pay-television network.

Fox
From October 1984 to April 1992, Diller held the positions of Chairman and Chief Executive Officer of 20th Century Fox, where he launched the Fox network and greenlighted shows such as Married... with Children and The Simpsons.

QVC

On February 24, 1992, Diller announced that he would leave Fox within a three month period, citing a desire to "own my own store." After leaving Fox, Diller's company Arrow Investments Inc. purchased a $25 million stake in the QVC teleshopping network. Despite owning less than 3 percent of the network, Diller gained supervision of the network after forming a partnership with Liberty Media Corporation and the Comcast Corporation which made all of their shares a single group on matters which required shareholder approval. He then launched a bid to purchase Paramount Communications, but lost it to Viacom. Diller resigned from QVC in 1995.

HSN and USA Broadcasting
In August 1995, Diller acquired the assets of Silver King Broadcasting. His ownership of Silver Broadcasting would be finalized in March 1996. In August 1996, it was agreed that Silver King Broadcasting, now under Diller's leadership, would buy back the Home Shopping Network (HSN), a former Silver King asset which split from the company in 1992, and that the two companies would merge. In December 1996, Silver King Broadcasting acquired an 80% stake in HSN for $1.3 billion worth of stock, and afterwards changed its own name to HSN, Inc.. Through his purchase of HSN, Diller would also eventually acquire Universal's cable and domestic-television assets from the Bronfman family.

Due to Home Shopping getting more notoriety on the cable networks from his former dealings with the QVC Network, Diller sought to repurpose the broadcast stations into independent, locally run stations as part of a station group dubbed USA Broadcasting of which the flagship station was WAMI-TV in Miami Beach, Florida. In October 1997, it was announced that Diller would be acquiring the USA Network, which was run by Kay Koplovitz, and other Seagram-owned Universal TV businesses, which included the Koplovitz-run USA Network spinoff Sci Fi Channel, for $4.1 billion and that these networks would be owned by Diller's Home Shopping Network. Diller previously had owned stock in the USA Network in the early 1980s, when Paramount Pictures acquired part of the network under his leadership. Paramount parent company Gulf + Western also owned the Madison Square Garden Sports Corp., which helped create the USA Network with Koplovitz. He was also was the one who put together the 1981 USA Network ownership agreement between Paramount, Time Inc. and MCA which convinced Madison Square Garden management to not sell their interests in the network.

Diller's purchase of the USA Network was finalized in February 1998. In April 1998, Diller would assume the Chairman and CEO positions which Koplovitz previously held at USA Networks since 1977. During Diller's time as head of the USA Network, the network's flagship WWF programming experienced a dramatic ratings turnaround, with WWF Raw dominating the ratings on cable television. Under Diller's leadership, the USA Network also showed tolerance to the growing WWF angles which were breaking with traditional censorship and were considered controversial, with even his USA Network spokesman David Schwartz describing an incident where the wrestler Jacqueline exposed one of her breasts as “not worse than anything you see on broadcast television at that time of night, such as NYPD Blue.” Shaun Assel and Mike Mooneyham's book Sex, Lies, and Headlocks: The Real Story of Vince McMahon and World Wrestling Entertainment stated that "the terrain shifted completely under everyone's feet" following Diller's purchase of the USA Network and also resulted in him and Universal TV executive Bonnie Hammer, who was regarded as the most sympathetic USA Network executive when came to relations with the WWF, thwarting an attempt which Koplovitz and other USA Network executives, including network entertainment head Rod Perth, made to remove the WWF from the USA Network in May 1998. Hammer, who has openly credited Diller as her mentor, would in later years serve on the Board of Directors at IAC/InterActiveCorp.

The purpose of the network was to have the flagship, WAMI, produce sports and news programming while testing locally produced general-interest programming for the other stations in the group. Due to the high costs of producing and acquiring talent for shows outside the typical areas of New York City and Los Angeles, plus the significantly low ratings such shows received in Miami Beach, the remaining shows were moved to Los Angeles to regain traction, but never did. Diller eventually sold the TV assets to Univision after rejecting a bid from The Walt Disney Company. The USA Network and its assets were later sold off to Vivendi. Diller was still involved with the USA Network until the Vivendi sale was announced in December 2001. Diller retained the assets of the Home Shopping Network and the subsequent Internet assets he acquired later to bolster the HSN Online stable that later became IAC/InterActiveCorp.

2000s

Diller was the Chairman of Expedia and the Chairman of IAC/InterActiveCorp, an interactive commerce conglomerate and the parent of companies including HomeAdvisor, Match Group (until 2020), Citysearch, and Connected Ventures, home of Vimeo and CollegeHumor (until 2020). IAC/InterActiveCorp is also the parent company of Tinder, UrbanSpoon, The Daily Beast, and more. In 2005, IAC/InterActiveCorp acquired Ask.com, marking a strategic move into the Internet search category. He stepped down as Chief Executive Officer of IAC/InterActiveCorp on December 2, 2010.

The new headquarters for the IAC/InterActiveCorp, the IAC Building was designed by Frank Gehry and opened in 2007 at 18th Street and the West Side Highway in Manhattan's Chelsea neighborhood. The western half of the block is dedicated to the building, which stands several stories taller than the massive Chelsea Piers sporting complex just across the West Side Highway. The extra floors guarantee a panoramic Hudson River view from Diller's sixth-floor office.

Diller has been on the board of Coca-Cola since 2002.

In 2003, on the PBS program NOW with Bill Moyers, Diller voiced a strong warning against media consolidation. In the interview he referred to media ownership by a few big corporations as an oligarchy, saying the concentration strangles new ideas.

Diller was "the highest-paid executive [of fiscal year 2005]", according to a report by The New York Times on October 26, 2006, with total compensation in excess of $295 million (mostly from stock).

In an opinion article in The New York Times of November 7, 2006, Nicholas D. Kristof awarded him his annual Michael Eisner Award, consisting of a five-dollar shower curtain, for corporate rapacity and laziness.Nicholas D. Kristof, America’s Laziest Man?, The New York Times, November 7, 2006. In October 2019, Diller had a $4.2 billion fortune in technology companies, after investing early on in companies such as Match.com and Vimeo. In 2012, Diller became an investor in the streaming service company Aereo. Aereo went out of business in June 2014 after the United States Supreme ruled that its method of streaming media content violated copyright laws.

Since 2013, Diller has co-produced more than ten Broadway shows in partnership with Scott Rudin, including To Kill A Mockingbird, West Side Story, Carousel, The Humans, Three Tall Woman, Gary: A Sequel to Titus Andronicus, and A Doll's House, Part 2. IAC Films has also backed numerous films produced by Rudin, including Uncut Gems, Lady Bird, Eighth Grade, The Meyerowitz Stories, and Ex Machina.In early 2020, Diller took over Expedia's day-to-day operations alongside the Vice Chairman Peter Kern, after the company's CFO stepped down in December 2019. In the midst of the COVID-19 pandemic, Expedia's shares plummeted along with those of other travel companies. Diller announced that Expedia is generating no revenue and would have to cut costs. And he has been member of the advisory board of the Peter G. Peterson Foundation.

"The Killer Dillers"
Diller is responsible for what the media dubs "The Killer Dillers" – people whom Diller mentored and who later became major media and internet executives in their own right. Examples include Michael Eisner (who was President of Paramount Pictures while Diller was its Chairman & CEO, and went on to become Chairman & CEO of The Walt Disney Company), Jeffrey Katzenberg (a head of production of Paramount under Diller who became a co-founder of DreamWorks SKG and former head of DreamWorks Animation and Walt Disney Studios), Don Simpson (who was President of Production at Paramount under Diller and Eisner before forming an independent production company initially based on the Paramount lot with Jerry Bruckheimer), Dara Khosrowshahi (CEO of Uber), Dawn Steel (a VP of Production for Paramount when Diller was Chair & CEO; she went on to become President of Columbia Pictures, one of the first women to run a major movie studio) and Garth Ancier (former President of BBC America).

Diller worked with Stephen Chao at Fox Television Network, whom he later hired as President of Programming and Marketing at USA Network. Julius Genachowski, chairman of the Federal Communications Commission, served as Diller's General Counsel during their tenure at USA Broadcasting, and again as Chief of Business Operations and a member of Barry Diller's Office of the Chairman at IAC/InterActiveCorp.

Accusations of insider trading
On March 9, 2022, The Wall Street Journal reported that Diller, David Geffen and his stepson, Alex Von Furstenberg were being investigated by the Securities and Exchange Commission and the United States Department of Justice for insider trading of options on Activision Blizzard just three days before Microsoft's announced acquisition. Diller denied the allegations and claimed it was "It was simply a lucky bet."

Personal life

In 2001, Diller married fashion designer Diane von Fürstenberg, mother of Prince Alexander von Fürstenberg and Princess Tatiana von Fürstenberg. He is a member of the Democratic Party and supporter of related political causes. As of June 2020, Diller's estimated net worth was $4.2 billion. He owns a superyacht.

Diller's sexual orientation has been discussed in the media. In James B. Stewart's 2005 book DisneyWar, erstwhile Paramount colleague Michael Eisner characterized Diller as "a homosexual." In 2001, New York Magazine'''s Maer Roshan wrote:The recent wedding of Barry Diller and Diane Von Fürstenberg epitomizes the media’s convoluted approach to covering gay celebrities. I would not presume to speculate on their relationship, which is said to be a warm and genuine one. But it’s also true that Diller did not live as a monk before his marriage at the age of 59 – in fact, while Diller is often referred to as bisexual, he has lived most of his adult life as a more or less openly gay man. He has had both short-term boyfriends and long-term relationships (including one with a former editor-in-chief of The Advocate); he appears frequently at gay parties and gay benefits. His sexual orientation has even been referred to in print with regularity.

Still, because Diller had never actually sent out a press release acknowledging he was gay, journalists faced with the news of his wedding were in a quandary: All across Manhattan, reporters offered various explanations – financial and otherwise – for his apparent midlife transformation. But none, of course, made it into print.

Philanthropy
In 2011, the Diller-von Fürstenberg Family Foundation announced a donation of $20 million to support the completion of the High Line park in Manhattan. In 2012, Diller donated $30 million to the Hollywood Fund, which provides health and social care to retired individuals from the show-business world.

In 2015, Diller and his wife committed to donate $260 million toward Little Island, a public park and performance space on a reconstructed pier in the Hudson River in New York City. It is stated to be the largest donation to a public park in city history. The park was completed on May 21, 2021.

Honors and recognition
 1990: DGA Honorary Life Member Award
 1992: Golden Plate Award of the American Academy of Achievement
 1994:''' Television Hall of Fame

References

External links
 
 
 "Diller, Barry". The Museum of Broadcast Communications. Retrieved 14 July 2006.
 

1942 births
American billionaires
American Broadcasting Company executives
American film studio executives
American mass media owners
American technology company founders
American businesspeople in the online media industry
California Democrats
Directors of The Coca-Cola Company
Fox Broadcasting Company executives
Jewish American philanthropists
American Broadcasting Company Vice Presidents of Programs
Giving Pledgers
21st-century philanthropists
IAC (company) people
Expedia Group people
Living people
American film producers
Paramount Pictures executives
20th Century Studios people
NBCUniversal people